El Coll is a neighbourhood of Gràcia, one of the 10 districts Barcelona is divided in. Located at the base of Tibidabo hill, it's 300 meters above sea level and is nowadays inhabited by 6.850 people.

History
Its history goes back to the 11th century with the construction of the church that bore its name: Església del Coll. 

At the beginning of the 20th century, the neighbourhood was filled with "masies" and houses.

At 60th, El Coll suffered an urbanistic explosion and was invaded by all kind of constructions that took up all free spaces that remained.

In 1976 it was demanded to construct a park. The quarry of "la Creueta" was not in use and in there was constructed the Parc de la Creueta del Coll.

See also 

 Street names in Barcelona
 Urban planning of Barcelona

References

Neighbourhoods of Barcelona
Gràcia